Amblema plicata, common name the threeridge, is a species of freshwater mussel, an aquatic bivalve mollusk in the family Unionidae, the river mussels.

References 

Unionidae
Bivalves of North America
Fauna of the Great Lakes region (North America)
Bivalves described in 1817